Kitty is a 1929 British drama film directed by Victor Saville and starring Estelle Brody and John Stuart.  The film was adapted from the 1927 novel of the same name by Warwick Deeping and marked the third co-star billing of Brody and Stuart, who had previously proved a very popular screen pairing in Mademoiselle from Armentieres (1926) and Hindle Wakes (1927).

Kitty was initially planned and filmed as a silent, but after its original release Saville decided to reshoot the latter part with sound. As no suitable facilities were yet available in Britain, Saville, Brody and Stuart travelled to New York to shoot the new sequences at RKO Studios. The film was released in the form of a silent which switched to sound three quarters of the way through.

Plot
In pre-World War I London, handsome young aviator Alex St. George (Stuart) meets and falls in love with shopgirl Kitty Greenwood (Brody). He asks her to marry him, to the horror of his snobbish, class-bound mother (Dorothy Cumming), who is appalled by the notion of her son marrying into a family who run a tobacconists shop. Before the wedding can take place, war breaks out and Alex is called up to serve as a pilot.

Seeing her opportunity to sabotage the relationship, Mrs. St. George sets about trying to poison Alex's mind against Kitty by feeding him via letter a string of malicious and false tales about Kitty's behaviour, alleging that in his absence she is frequently to be seen around town flirting and behaving in an improper manner with other young men. Alex becomes so unnerved and distraught about his mother's stories that his concentration is affected and he crashes his plane, suffering not only critical injuries which leave him in danger of paralysis, but also amnesia.

Alex is repatriated to England for treatment and faces a long and painful physical rehabilitation and the struggle to regain his memory, while at the same time a battle of wills is being waged by his mother and Kitty, both trying to convince him that the other is lying. Eventually Kitty succeeds in rekindling his love for her, and Mrs. St. George is crushed.

Cast
 Estelle Brody as Kitty Greenwood
 John Stuart as Alex St. George
 Dorothy Cumming as Mrs. St. George
 Marie Ault as Sarah Greenwood
 Winter Hall as John Furnival
 Olaf Hytten as Leaper
 Charles O'Shaugnessy as Reuben
 Elwood Fleet Bostwick as Dr. Dazely
 Gibb McLaughlin as Electrician
 Rex Maurice as Dr. Drake
 Moore Marriott as Workman

Historical significance
Kitty, released in May 1929, is sometimes cited as the first British sound film as it was released in cinemas before Alfred Hitchcock's Blackmail, the other candidate for the honour. But that date only actually applies to its first silent version; the film was soon withdrawn from exhibition and retooled as a part-talkie, following the release of Blackmail. Furthermore, opponents of its claim point out that the sound portion of Kitty was filmed in the US, whereas Blackmail was filmed entirely in the UK. Drawing the distinction between "first British film with sound" and "first sound film made in Britain", this view holds that the latter is the true definition of the term and the distinction therefore goes to Blackmail.

References

External links 
 
 

1929 films
1929 drama films
British silent feature films
Films shot at British International Pictures Studios
Films directed by Victor Saville
British black-and-white films
Films based on British novels
Films set in England
Films set in London
Films set in France
British World War I films
British drama films
Transitional sound drama films
British aviation films
1920s English-language films
1920s British films
English-language drama films